Alejandra Granillo (born 1 June 1991) is a Mexican former professional tennis player.

Biography
Granillo, a right-handed player, grew up in the Mexican city of Pachuca and was taught the sport by her father.

In both 2009 and 2010, Granillo competed for the Mexico Fed Cup team, appearing in a total of seven ties. As a professional player she featured mostly on the ITF circuit, but made a WTA Tour main draw appearance as a wildcard at Acapulco in 2010, where she was beaten in the first round by Kaia Kanepi. She won a singles bronze medal at the 2010 Central American and Caribbean Games.

From 2011 to 2014 she played college tennis with Pepperdine University in the United States. She represented Mexico at the 2011 Summer Universiade. As a freshman she earned All-WCC first team selection for doubles.

ITF finals

Singles (0–1)

References

External links
 
 
 

1991 births
Living people
Mexican female tennis players
Pepperdine Waves women's tennis players
Central American and Caribbean Games bronze medalists for Mexico
Sportspeople from Pachuca
Competitors at the 2010 Central American and Caribbean Games
Central American and Caribbean Games medalists in tennis
21st-century Mexican women